In general, "burning spring(s)" refers to any water-fed spring that percolates natural gas that may be set afire.

Burning Springs may refer to:

United States
Burning Springs, Kentucky
Burning Springs, West Virginia
 Springs in the town of Bristol, New York visited by explorers Robert de La Salle and René de Bréhant de Galinée in 1669

Azerbaijan
 The Yanar Bulaq (burning springs) on Yanar Dag (Fire Mountain)